John Ernest Bechdolt (1884–1954) was an American short story writer, novelist and journalist. He wrote under the name Jack Bechdolt as well as his full name. He worked for the Seattle Post-Intelligencer from 1909 to 1916, after which he moved to New York, where he worked for Munsey Publications for a year before freelancing. His first novel, The Torch, was serialized in the magazine Argosy in 1920. Several of his stories were adapted into films.

Bechdolt served as a solicitor for the Seattle Post-Intelligencer in 1910. During that time, he was also drawing; he was listed as a member of the Seattle Cartoonists' Club in their 1911 book The Cartoon; A Reference Book of Seattle's Successful Men. He also signed one of the illustrations in the book, a caricature of a painter.

Books by Jack Bechdolt
 The Lost Vikings (1931)
 The Vanishing Hounds (1941)
 ‘’Junior Air Raid Wardens’’ (1942)
 The Torch (1948)
 On the Air: A Story of Television, a novel (E. P. Dutton, 1950)
 The Modern Handy Book for Boys (1933)

References

External links
 

1884 births
1954 deaths
20th-century American novelists
20th-century American male writers
American fantasy writers
American illustrators
American male novelists
American science fiction writers
American male screenwriters
Journalists from Washington (state)
Novelists from Minnesota
Writers from Seattle
American male short story writers
American male journalists
20th-century American short story writers
Novelists from Washington (state)
20th-century American non-fiction writers
Screenwriters from Minnesota
Screenwriters from Washington (state)
20th-century American screenwriters